Ashok Debbarma is a politician from Tripura. He is currently involved with  Indian National Congress party. He won the election in 2003 in the Golaghati Assembly constituency and became an MLA

References

Living people
Year of birth missing (living people)
Delhi University alumni
Tripura MLAs 2003–2008
Indian National Congress (Organisation) politicians